The 1992 Dallas Cowboys season was the franchise's 33rd season in the National Football League (NFL) and was the fourth year of the franchise under head coach Jimmy Johnson. The Cowboys made the first of three Super Bowl appearances between 1992–95.

Headed by a powerful offense and the NFL's number one ranked defense, Dallas fielded at the time, the youngest team in the NFL and posted a franchise-best 13–3 record throughout the regular season. In the playoffs, the Cowboys disposed of the Philadelphia Eagles, followed by a memorable victory against the San Francisco 49ers en route to a Super Bowl XXVII win over the Buffalo Bills.

This team ranked #6 on the 100 greatest teams of all time presented by the NFL on its 100th anniversary.

Offseason

NFL Draft

Preseason

Season summary
The season would start off with two crucial wins against the Washington Redskins and the New York Giants, both victors of the previous two Super Bowls.  A ferocious Dallas defense, with not a single player nominated to the Pro Bowl, placed first in the NFL in total defense.  Running back Emmitt Smith would also collect his second straight NFL rushing title.    
The 1992 season would also see a renewed rivalry between the Cowboys and the San Francisco 49ers in the NFC Championship game set over a decade after the famous play known as The Catch.  This ultimately started the rise of the 49ers and fall of the Cowboys throughout the 1980s.   The rise of the 1990s Cowboys was christened with a 30–20 victory against San Francisco at Candlestick Park.  Both franchises would later meet again in the next two NFC Championship games in what many consider to be a classic series of contest of future Hall of Fame players.

At the Rose Bowl, site of Super Bowl XXVII, the Cowboys would struggle early, finding themselves down 0–7, but later regroup when Aikman's pass to tight end Jay Novacek tied the game 7–7.  From there, Dallas would gain all momentum and rout the Buffalo Bills 52–17, forcing a record 9 turnovers and knocking Bills quarterback Jim Kelly out of the game.  Troy Aikman would earn Super Bowl MVP honors after completing 22 of 30 passes for 273 yards and 4 touchdowns to wrap up a phenomenal postseason performance.

Notable additions to the team this year included defensive end Charles Haley, cornerback Kevin Smith, linebacker Robert Jones, safety Thomas Everett, safety Darren Woodson and wide receiver Jimmy Smith (though Smith would never catch a pass during his time with the team).

The Dallas defense (nicknamed "Doomsday II") enjoyed a renaissance, but has never received due credit for its achievements:

 It was only the third defense since 1980 to hold opponents to fewer than 4,000 yards in a 16-game season. The other defenses to have done it are recognized as two of the greatest of modern era – the 1984 Chicago Bears and the 1991 Philadelphia Eagles.
 It was the second defense to rank No. 1 in fewest yards yielded without sending a player to the Pro Bowl. The 1983 Cincinnati Bengals, who had a losing record were the first.
 The defense finished first in the NFL in total defense (245.8 yards-per-game), while the secondary finished the year fifth in passing defense (168.1 yards-per-game).
 It led the NFL in defense against the rush and fewest first downs allowed. Its league lead in preventing third-down conversions was staggering. Dallas's opponents converted 27.2 percent. The Seattle Seahawks ranked second at 32.6 percent.
 It set a club record by holding the Seattle Seahawks to 62 yards in a 27–0 victory and closed the season by holding the Chicago Bears to fewer than 100 yards.
 Super Bowl XXVII saw the Cowboys defense at its best, producing a Super Bowl record 9 turnovers (5 fumbles and 4 interceptions) and even scoring two touchdowns.
 Four starters were rookies or second year players (Russell Maryland, Robert Jones, Larry Brown and Kevin Smith), and two other joined the team after the preseason (Charles Haley and Thomas Everett).
 This version of the "Doomsday Defense" had tremendous speed and depth. They were also young, with the age of the starters averaging 25 ½ years.

Regular season

Standings

Game summaries

Week 1: vs Washington Redskins

Week 2: at New York Giants

The Cowboys won despite giving up the game's final 28 points.

Week 3: vs Phoenix Cardinals

Week 5: at Philadelphia Eagles

The Cowboys were defeated in their first meeting with Eagles running back Herschel Walker since they traded him from Dallas to the Vikings during the 1989 season.   Walker scored twice while putting up 100 all-purpose yards against the Cowboys.  Troy Aikman was intercepted three times.

Week 6: vs Seattle Seahawks

Week 7: vs Kansas City Chiefs

Week 8: at Los Angeles Raiders

Emmitt Smith led the way with 152 rushing yards and 3 touchdowns, with Troy Aikman running for a TD to go along with his 234 yards passing.  The Cowboys' defense held Los Angeles to just 188 total offensive yards – 71 rushing and 117 passing.

Week 9: vs Philadelphia Eagles

Week 10: at Detroit Lions

The Cowboys held the Lions to 201 total yards, 108 of them from Barry Sanders.  Rodney Peete and Erik Kramer were intercepted a total of three times.

Week 11: vs Los Angeles Rams

Week 12: at Phoenix Cardinals

Week 13: vs New York Giants

Week 14: at Denver Broncos

The Cowboys had their hands full as Tommy Maddox threw three touchdowns but was intercepted four times.  The Broncos took a fourth-quarter lead on an 81-yard touchdown to Cedric Tillman.  Emmitt Smith was held to just 62 yards but ran in the winning score.

Week 15: at Washington Redskins

Emmitt Smith recovered a fumble in his own endzone in the fourth quarter; he threw the ball and was intercepted by Danny Copeland for the winning Redskins touchdown.   A livid Jimmy Johnson railed at his players on the air flight home.

Week 16: at Atlanta Falcons

Week 17: vs Chicago Bears

Curvin Richards rushed for his only career touchdown, but fumbled twice and was cut from the Cowboys the next day.

Post-Season

Schedule

NFC Divisional Round: Dallas Cowboys 34, Philadelphia Eagles 10 

The Cowboys held the Eagles to 178 total net yards; Randall Cunningham managed a late touchdown but managed only 182 combined yards and was sacked five times for 45 lost yards; Herschel Walker managed only 29 rushing yards and caught six passes for 37 yards.  Troy Aikman had two touchdowns and 200 passing yards (88 of them to Michael Irvin) while Emmitt Smith rushed for 114 yards and a score.

NFC Conference Championship: Dallas Cowboys 30, San Francisco 49ers 20 

The two teams combined for 831 yards in the Cowboys first overall win over the 49ers since 1980.  A failed Cowboys fourth-down conversion attempt while up 24–13 set up Steve Young's touchdown to Jerry Rice late in the fourth quarter, but San Francisco's comeback attempt ended when a 70-yard Alvin Harper catch set up Kelvin Martin's touchdown catch and a subsequent interception of Young, the Niners' fourth turnover of the game.  On Harper’s late catch the play was initially intended for Michael Irvin but he and Harper switched routes in the huddle. This was the last road playoff win for the Cowboys until 2023.

Super Bowl

Staff

Roster

Awards and records
 Troy Aikman, Super Bowl Most Valuable Player
 Robert Jones, Linebacker, UPI NFL-NFC Rookie of the Year

Publications
 The Football Encyclopedia 
 Total Football 
 Cowboys Have Always Been My Heroes

References

External links
 1992 Dallas Cowboys
 Pro Football Hall of Fame
 Dallas Cowboys Official Site

NFC East championship seasons
Dallas Cowboys seasons
Dallas
National Football Conference championship seasons
Super Bowl champion seasons
Dallas